Valgoglio is a comune (municipality) in the Province of Bergamo in the Italian region of Lombardy, located about  northeast of Milan and about  northeast of Bergamo. 

Valgoglio borders the following municipalities: Ardesio, Branzi, Carona, Gandellino, Gromo.

References